Taraka Ramudu is a 1997 Telugu romantic drama film directed by R. V. Udayakumar starring Srikanth and Soundarya. The film was dubbed in Tamil as Velli Nilave.

Cast
Srikanth as Ramudu
Soundarya as Taraka
Srikanya as Ramudu's cousin
Ranganath as Gajapati
Anand Raj as Gajapati's brother-in-law
Karikalan

Soundtrack 

The soundtrack was composed by Koti and all lyrics were written by Sirivennela Seetharama Sastry.

Release
The film was partially reshot and released in Tamil as Vellai Nilave with Manivannan and Senthil. Actor Selva dubbed for Srikanth's character in the Tamil version of the film.

References

External links

1997 films
1990s Telugu-language films
Films scored by Koti
Films directed by R. V. Udayakumar